

CEOP Education 
The National Crime Agency’s CEOP Education team (NCA-CEOP) aim to help protect children and young people from the threat of online child sexual abuse and exploitation, reducing vulnerability to abuse, and increasing confidence and ability to seek help from an appropriate source when needed.

The national online safety education programme was established in 2006 as part of the Child Exploitation and Online Protection centre (CEOP). It has since evolved over time to reflect continuing changes in the online landscape.

To ensure that the programme is led by the latest intelligence and incorporates changes within the Child Sexual Abuse threat, the NCA CEOP Education team work closely with other teams across the Agency and has strong external partnerships with key organisations working in this space.

CEOP Education Programme
Previously known as Thinkuknow, the education programme aims to reduce the vulnerability of children and young people to sexual abuse and encourage disclosure of abuse to trusted adults through the CEOP Safety Centre and other reporting routes.

The programme is underpinned by the latest intelligence from the NCA and delivers high-quality advice, resources and education about online safety, sexual abuse and exploitation to three key audiences (professionals, children and young people, parents and carers).

The three core products delivered by the programme include:

 Education resources for children and young people aged 4–18
 Awareness resources for parents and carers
 Specialist training and resources for professionals working within the children’s workforce.

The programme is founded on six values to ensure safe, effective and child-centred delivery of online safety education.

 Safeguarding first – the safety and wellbeing of each child always comes first.
 Approach from the perspective of the child – let children start the conversation. Understand what the online world means to them and explore the positive opportunities it presents, as well as the risks.
 Promote dialogue and understanding – young people are safest when they feel listened to and understood and know that they can ask trusted adults for help when they need it.
 Empower and enable children – children have the right to be protected from harm, and to be supported to build knowledge, skills and confidence which will help them identify risk and access support when they need it.
 Never frighten or scare-monger – alarmist education can be risky and ineffective. Avoid shocking or scaring young people, their families or other professionals.
 Challenge victim-blaming attitudes – we all have a responsibility to challenge victim-blaming wherever it arises. CEOP Education helps young people understand that the abuse is never the fault of those who have been harmed and builds their confidence to ask a trusted adult for help when they need it.

Resources and Training
The education programme delivers a variety of resources, available across all age groups, which are used by children, young people, parents, carers and professionals. Resources are available across websites for each audience. As part of the work around maximising reach and accessibility, work also continues to develop around embedding online safety and education into school settings, in addition to adapting resources for SEND children and young people.

The education programme seeks to:

 Implement primary prevention strategies for children and young people, reducing their vulnerability to exploitation and increasing their confidence and ability to seek help from an appropriate source when needed.
 Equip educational professionals with the tools to safely and effectively communicate the topic of CSA, facilitate open discussions and support disclosures.
 Support parents and carers in helping to promote online safety at home.

The majority of CEOP Education’s education resources for young people have been awarded the PSHE Association Quality Mark, demonstrating that the content supports safe and effective teaching practice and meets the PSHE Association's 'Ten principles of effective PSHE education'. All education resources are mapped against the PSHE Association Programme of Study and each relevant UK curriculum, including Relationships & Health Education (England) and Computing curriculums.

CEOP Education delivers specialist training for those working directly with children and young people.

See also
Child Exploitation and Online Protection Centre
Internet Watch Foundation
Serious Organised Crime Agency
Virtual Global Taskforce

References

Anti–child pornography organizations
Law enforcement websites
Law enforcement in the United Kingdom